Butter Factory may refer to:

New South Wales, Australia
 Kiama Pioneer Butter Factory, former butter factory

Queensland, Australia
 Boonah Butter Factory, heritage-listed former butter factory
 Kingaroy Butter Factory, heritage-listed former butter factory
 Kingston Butter Factory, former butter factory
 Nanango Butter Factory Building, heritage-listed butter factory